Maklok is a rural locality (a settlement) in Shuberskoye Rural Settlement of Novousmansky District of Voronezh Oblast, Russia, located in a forest  north from the district's administrative center of Novaya Usman. Population: 39 (2005 est.).

References

Notes

Sources

Rural localities in Novousmansky District